The following is a list of South End Press books. Where books have been republished since the closure of South End Press in 2014, the new publisher is show.

African American Studies

We Want Freedom: A Life in the Black Panther Party by Mumia Abu-Jamal; Kathleen Cleaver (Introduction)
When the Prisoners Ran Walpole: A True Story in the Movement for Prison Abolition by Jamie Bissonette
Race and Resistance: African Americans in the Twenty-First Century by Herb Boyd (Editor)
Another America: The Politics of Race and Blame by Kofi Buenor Hadjor
Black Geographies and the Politics of Place by Katherine McKittrick (Editor) and Clyde Woods (Editor)
Black Liberation in Conservative America by Manning Marable
Black Looks: Race and Representation by bell hooks
Breaking Bread: Insurgent Black Intellectual Life by bell hooks and Cornel West
Breeding a Nation: Reproductive Slavery and the Pursuit of Freedom by Pamela D. Bridgewater
Chain of Change: Struggles for Black Community Development by Mel King
Color of Violence: The INCITE! Anthology by INCITE! Women of Color Against Violence
Common Differences: Conflicts in Black and White Feminist Perspectives by Gloria Joseph and Jill Lewis
Death Blossoms: Reflections from a Prisoner of Conscience by Mumia Abu-Jamal; Foreword by Cornel West, Introduction by Julia Wright
Feminist Theory: From Margin to Center by bell hooks
From Civil Rights to Black Liberation: Malcolm X and the Organization of Afro-American Unity by William W. Sales, Jr.
Homegrown: Engaged Cultural Criticism by bell hooks and Amalia Mesa-Bains
How Capitalism Underdeveloped Black America: Problems in Race, Political Economy, and Society by Manning Marable
Incognegro: A Memoir of Exile and Apartheid by Frank B. Wilderson III, Duke University Press
Our Enemies in Blue: Police and Power in America (Revised Edition) by Kristian Williams
Outsiders Within: Writing on Transracial Adoption by Jane Jeong Trenka (Editor), Julia Chinyere Oparah (Editor), and Sun Yung Shin (Editor)
Pipe Dream Blues: Racism and the War on Drugs by Clarence Lusane
Race and Resistance: African Americans in the Twenty-First Century by Herb Boyd (Editor)
Race in the Global Era: African Americans at the Millennium by Clarence Lusane; Julianne Malveaux (Foreword)
The Revolution Starts at Home: Confronting Intimate Violence Within Activist Communities by Ching-In Chen (Editor), Jai Dulani (Editor), and Leah Lakshmi Piepzna-Samarasinha (Editor); Andrea Smith (preface)
Sisters of the Yam: Black Women and Self-Recovery by bell hooks
Sisters of the Yam: Black Women and Self-Recovery audio by bell hooks and Ayo Sesheni (Narrator)
Talking Back: Thinking Feminist, Thinking Black by bell hooks
What Lies Beneath: Katrina, Race, and the State of the Nation by South End Press Collective (editors); Afterword by Joy James
Women Writing Resistance: Essays on Latin America and the Caribbean by Jennifer Browdy de Hernandez (Editor); Preface by Elizabeth Martínez

Asian American Studies

Soil Not Oil: Environmental Justice in an Age of Climate Crisis by Vandana Shiva
Violence Every Day: Police Brutality and Racial Profiling Against Women, Girls, and Trans People of Color by Andrea J. Ritchie
Color of Violence: The INCITE! Anthology by INCITE! Women of Color Against Violence
Disposable Domestics: Immigrant Women Workers in the Global Factory by Grace Chang; Mimi Abramovitz (Foreword)
Dragon Ladies: Asian American Feminists Breathe Fire by Sonia Shah (Editor); Yuri Kochiyama (Preface); Karin Aguilar-San Juan (Foreword) 
Islands in Captivity: The International Tribunal on the Rights of Indigenous Hawaiians by Ward Churchill (Editor) and Sharon H. Venne (Editor); Lilikala Kame'eleihiwa (Hawaiian language editor)
Outsiders Within: Writing on Transracial Adoption by Jane Jeong Trenka (Editor), Julia Chinyere Oparah (Editor), and Sun Yung Shin (Editor)
The Revolution Starts at Home: Confronting Intimate Violence Within Activist Communities by Ching-In Chen (Editor), Jai Dulani (Editor), and Leah Lakshmi Piepzna-Samarasinha (Editor); Andrea Smith (preface)
The Shock of Arrival: Reflections on Postcolonial Experience by Meena Alexander
Sovereign Acts by Frances Negrón-Muntaner
The State of Asian America: Activism and Resistance in the 1990s by Karin Aguilar-San Juan (Editor); David Henry Hwang (Foreword)
Sweatshop Warriors: Immigrant Women Workers Take On the Global Factory by Miriam Ching and Yoon Louie  
What Lies Beneath: Katrina, Race, and the State of the Nation by South End Press Collective (editors); Afterword by Joy James

Critical Race Theory

VIOLENCE EVERY DAY: Police Brutality and Racial Profiling Against Women, Girls, and Trans People of Color by Andrea J. Ritchie
AMERICAN METHODS: Torture and the Logic of Domination by Kristian Williams
Black Geographies and the Politics of Place by Katherine McKittrick (Editor) and Clyde Woods (Editor)
Color of Violence: The INCITE! Anthology by INCITE! Women of Color Against Violence
Conquest: Sexual Violence and American Indian Genocide, by Andrea Smith, Duke University Press
Incognegro: A Memoir of Exile and Apartheid by Frank B. Wilderson III
Outsiders Within: Writing on Transracial Adoption by Jane Jeong Trenka (Editor), Julia Chinyere Oparah (Editor), and Sun Yung Shin (Editor)
Sisters of the Yam: Black Women and Self-Recovery by bell hooks
Sovereign Acts by Frances Negrón-Muntaner
What Lies Beneath: Katrina, Race, and the State of the Nation by South End Press Collective (editors); Afterword by Joy James
Yearning: Race, Gender, and Cultural Politics by bell hooks

Critical Theory

Normal Life: Administrative Violence, Critical Trans Politics, and the Limits of Law by Dean Spade, Duke University Press
The Revolution Will Not Be Funded: Beyond the Non-Profit Industrial Complex by INCITE! Women of Color Against Violence
Sisters of the Yam: Black Women and Self-Recovery by bell hooks

Cultural Studies

American Methods: Torture and the Logic of Domination by Kristian Williams
Beauty Secrets: Women and the Politics of Appearance by Wendy Chapkis
Black Geographies and the Politics of Place by Katherine McKittrick (Editor) and Clyde Woods (Editor)
Black Looks: Race and Representation by bell hooks
Color of Violence: The INCITE! Anthology by INCITE! Women of Color Against Violence
Common Differences: Conflicts in Black and White Feminist Perspectives by Gloria Joseph and Jill Lewis
Culture and Resistance: Conversations with Edward W. Said by David Barsamian and Edward W. SaidDirty Gold: Indigenous Alliances to End Global Resource Colonialism by Al GedicksEmma: A Play in Two Acts About Emma Goldman, American Anarchist by Howard ZinnGetting Off: Pornography and the End of Masculinity by Robert JensenHomegrown: Engaged Cultural Criticism by bell hooks and Amalia Mesa-BainsI Looked Over Jordan: And Other Stories by Ernie BrillIncognegro: A Memoir of Exile and Apartheid by Frank B. Wilderson IIILeft Out: The Politics of Exclusion: Essays 1964–2002 by Martin DubermanLouder Than Bombs: Interviews from The Progressive Magazine by David BarsamianMarx in Soho: A Play on History by Howard ZinnMedicine Stories: History, Culture, and the Politics of Integrity by Aurora Levins MoralesOn the Border by Michel WarschawskiOur Enemies in Blue: Police and Power in America by Kristian WilliamsOutsiders Within: Writing on Transracial Adoption by Jane Jeong Trenka (Editor), Julia Chinyere Oparah (Editor), and Sun Yung Shin (Editor)Playbook by Maxine Klein, Lydia Sargent, and Howard ZinnRecovering the Sacred: The Power of Naming and Claiming by Winona LaDukeRockin' the Boat: Mass Music and Mass Movements by Reebee Garofalo (Editor)The Shock of Arrival: Reflections on Postcolonial Experience by Meena AlexanderSigned, Sealed, and Delivered: True Life Stories of Women in Pop by Sue Steward and Sheryl GarrattSoul Clap Its Hands and Sing by Natalie PeteschSovereign Acts by Frances Negrón-MuntanerTheatre for the 98% by Maxine KleinVoices of Resistance: Indigenous Radio and the Struggle for Social Justice in Colombia by Mario MurilloWhat Lies Beneath: Katrina, Race, and the State of the Nation by South End Press Collective (editors); Afterword by Joy JamesWomen Writing Resistance: Essays on Latin America and the Caribbean by Jennifer Browdy de Hernandez (Editor); Preface by Elizabeth MartínezYearning: Race, Gender, and Cultural Politics by bell hooksZapata's Disciple: Essays by Martín Espada

DeclassifiedI Looked Over Jordan: And Other Stories by Ernie BrillPlaybook by Maxine Klein, Lydia Sargent, and Howard Zinn

Domestic RepressionViolence Every Day: Police Brutality and Racial Profiling Against Women, Girls, and Trans People of Color by Andrea J. RitchieNormal Life: Administrative Violence, Critical Trans Politics, and the Limits of Law by Dean SpadeAgents of Repression: The FBI's Secret Wars Against the American Indian Movement and the Black Panther Party by Ward Churchill and Jim Vander WallAmerican Methods: Torture and the Logic of Domination by Kristian WilliamsThe COINTELPRO Papers: Documents From the FBI's Secret Wars Against Dissent in the United States by Ward Churchill and Jim Vander WallDirty Gold: Indigenous Alliances to End Global Resource Colonialism by Al GedicksHow Nonviolence Protects the State by Peter GelderloosOur Enemies in Blue: Police and Power in America (Revised Edition) by Kristian WilliamsPolicing the National Body: Race, Gender and Criminalization by Jael Silliman (Editor) and Anannya Bhattacharjee (Editor); Angela Y. Davis (Foreword)What Lies Beneath: Katrina, Race, and the State of the Nation by South End Press Collective (editors); Afterword by Joy JamesWhen the Prisoners Ran Walpole: A True Story in the Movement for Prison Abolition by Jamie Bissonette

Ecology and Green PoliticsToolbox for Sustainable City Living: A Do-It-Ourselves Guide by Scott Kellogg and Stacy PettigrewStaying Alive: Women, Ecology and Development by Vandana ShivaBiopiratería: El Saqueo de la Naturaleza y del Conocimiento by Vandana ShivaBiopiracy: The Plunder of Nature and Knowledge by Vandana ShivaSoil Not Oil: Environmental Justice in an Age of Climate Crisis by Vandana ShivaAll Our Relations: Native Struggles for Land and Life by Winona LaDuke¡Cochabamba!: Water War in Bolivia by Oscar Olivera and Tom Lewis; Foreword by Vandana ShivaConfronting Environmental Racism: Voices from the Grassroots by Robert D. Bullard (Editor)Dangerous Intersections: Feminist Perspectives on Population, Environment, and Development by Jael Silliman (Editor) and Ynestra King (Editor)Defending the Earth: A Dialogue Between Murray Bookchin and Dave Foreman by Steve Chase (Editor), Murray Bookchin, and Dave ForemanDirty Gold: Indigenous Alliances to End Global Resource Colonialism by Al GedicksDying From Dioxin: A Citizen's Guide to Reclaiming Our Health and Rebuilding Democracy by Lois Marie GibbsEarth Democracy: Justice, Sustainability, and Peace by Vandana ShivaEarth for Sale: Reclaiming Ecology in the Age of Corporate Greenwash by Brian TokarEcological Democracy by Roy MorrisonFighting for Hope by Petra KellyLas Guerras del Agua: Privatización, Contaminación y Lucro by Vandana ShivaHeat:How to Stop the Planet From Burning by George MonbiotHighway Robbery: Transportation Racism and New Routes to Equity by Robert D. Bullard (Editor), Glenn S. Johnson (Editor), and Angel O. Torres (Editor)Manifestos on the Future of Food and Seed by Vandana Shiva (Editor), Carlo Petrini (Contributor), and Michael Pollan (Contributor)The New Resource Wars: Native and Environmental Struggles Against Multinational Corporations by Al Gedicks; Winona LaDuke (Foreword)No Nukes: Everyone's Guide to Nuclear Power by Anna GyorgyPower Politics by Arundhati RoyRecovering the Sacred: The Power of Naming and Claiming by Winona LaDukeResource Rebels: Native Challenges to Mining and Oil Corporations by Al GedicksRethinking Ecofeminist Politics by Janet BiehlStolen Harvest: The Hijacking of the Global Food Supply by Vandana ShivaThe Sun Betrayed: A Report on the Corporate Seizure of U.S. Solar Energy Development by Ray ReeceWater Wars: Privatization, Pollution, and Profit by Vandana Shiva

EconomicsToolbox for Sustainable City Living: A Do-It-Ourselves Guide by Scott Kellogg and Stacy PettigrewChaos or Community? Seeking Solutions, Not Scapegoats for Bad Economics by Holly SklarColor of Violence: The INCITE! Anthology by INCITE! Women of Color Against ViolenceEconomic Report of the People: An Alternative to the Economic Report of the President by Center for Popular EconomicsFifty Years is Enough: The Case Against the World Bank and the International Monetary Fund by Kevin Danaher (Editor)Global Village or Global Pillage: Economic Reconstruction from the Bottom Up by Jeremy Brecher and Tim CostelloGlobal Village or Global Pillage: How People Around the World Are Challenging Corporate Globalization by Jeremy Brecher, Tim Costello, and Brendan Smith; Edward Asner (Narrator)Globalization from Below: The Power of Solidarity by Jeremy Brecher, Tim Costello, and Brendan SmithHazardous to Our Wealth: Economic Policies in the 1980s by Frank AckermanKeeping Up With the Dow Joneses: Debt, Prison, Workfare by Vijay PrashadLooking Forward: Participatory Economics for the Twenty-First Century by Michael Albert and Robin HahnelManifestos on the Future of Food and Seed by Vandana Shiva (Editor), Carlo Petrini (Contributor), and Michael Pollan (Contributor)Mink Coats Don't Trickle Down: The Economic Attack on Women and People of Color by Randy Albelda, Elaine McCrate, Edwin Meléndez, and June LapidusOutsiders Within: Writing on Transracial Adoption by Jane Jeong Trenka (Editor), Julia Chinyere Oparah (Editor), and Sun Yung Shin (Editor)Panic Rules! Everything You Need to Know About the Global Economy by Robin Hahnel; Jeremy Brecher (Foreword)Private Interests, Public Spending: Balanced-Budget Conservatism and the Fiscal Crisis by Sidney Plotkin and William E. ScheuermanRaise the Floor: Wages and Policies that Work for All of Us by Holly Sklar and Laryssa Mykyta; Marie C. Wilson (Afterword)Reaganomics: Rhetoric vs. Reality by Frank AckermanThe Revolution Will Not Be Funded: Beyond the Non-Profit Industrial Complex by INCITE! Women of Color Against ViolenceTake the Rich Off Welfare by Mark ZepezauerWhat Lies Beneath: Katrina, Race, and the State of the Nation by South End Press Collective (editors); Afterword by Joy James

FeminismStaying Alive: Women, Ecology and Development by Vandana ShivaViolence Every Day: Police Brutality and Racial Profiling Against Women, Girls, and Trans People of Color by Andrea J. RitchieNormal Life: Administrative Violence, Critical Trans Politics, and the Limits of Law by Dean SpadeIn Kashmir: Gender, Militarization, and the Modern Nation-State by Seema KaziAbortion without Apology: A Radical History for the 1990s by Ninia BaehrAin't I a Woman: Black Women and Feminism by bell hooksAmerican Methods: Torture and the Logic of Domination by Kristian WilliamsBananeras: Women Transforming the Banana Unions of Latin America by Dana FrankColor of Violence: The INCITE! Anthology by INCITE! Women of Color Against ViolenceCommon Differences: Conflicts in Black and White Feminist Perspectives by Gloria Joseph and Jill LewisConquest: Sexual Violence and American Indian Genocide by Andrea SmithDangerous Intersections: Feminist Perspectives on Population, Environment, and Development by Jael Silliman (Editor) and Ynestra King (Editor)Feminism is For Everybody: Passionate Politics by bell hooksFeminist Theory: From Margin to Center by bell hooksGetting Off: Pornography and the End of Masculinity by Robert JensenGlass Ceilings and Bottomless Pits: Women's Work, Women's Poverty by Randy Albelda and Chris TillyHomegrown: Engaged Cultural Criticism by bell hooks and Amalia Mesa-BainsManifestos on the Future of Food and Seed by Vandana Shiva (Editor), Carlo Petrini (Contributor), and Michael Pollan (Contributor)Outsiders Within: Writing on Transracial Adoption by Jane Jeong Trenka (Editor), Julia Chinyere Oparah (Editor), and Sun Yung Shin (Editor)The Revolution Starts at Home: Confronting Intimate Violence Within Activist Communities by Ching-In Chen (Editor), Jai Dulani (Editor), and Leah Lakshmi Piepzna-Samarasinha (Editor); Andrea Smith (preface)Sisters of the Yam: Black Women and Self-Recovery by bell hooksSovereign Acts by Frances Negrón-MuntanerTalking Back: Thinking Feminist, Thinking Black by bell hooksUndivided Rights: Women of Color Organize for Reproductive Justice by Jael Silliman, Marlene Gerber Fried, Loretta Ross, and Elena GutiérrezWhat Lies Beneath: Katrina, Race, and the State of the Nation by South End Press Collective (editors); Afterword by Joy JamesWomen Writing Resistance: Essays on Latin America and the Caribbean by Jennifer Browdy de Hernandez (Editor); Preface by Elizabeth Martínez

Gay, Lesbian, Bisexual and Transgender StudiesCulture Clash: The Making of Gay Sensibility by Michael BronskiExile and Pride:Disability, Queerness, and Liberation by Eli Clare, Duke University Press

Gender and SexualityNormal Life: Administrative Violence, Critical Trans Politics and the Limits of Law, by Dean Spade

GlobalizationStaying Alive: Women, Ecology and Development, by Vandana Shiva

HealthToolbox for Sustainable City Living: A do-it-Ourselves Guide, Scott Kellogg and Stacy Pettigrew

 Politics/International Affairs 

 The Washington Connection and Third World Fascism,'' Noam Chomsky and Edward S. Herman

South End Press